Cell wall protein 2 (CWP2) is a cell wall protein, produced by Saccharomyces cerevisiae and Saccharomyces pastorianus. It occurs throughout the cell wall and has close homology with the CWP1 gene.

Disruption of CWP2 gene positively regulate translation, ribosome biogenesis and organonitrogen synthesis. these factors combined increases the overall synthesis of intercellular enzymes. Disruption of CWP2 genes also cause physical changes to the cell wall. Thickness of the cell wall decreases combined with decrease in cell wall density results in decline of cell wall stability. The overall result is the increase in the ability of heterologous protein production, in which is a significant commission of saccharomyces

References

Saccharomyces cerevisiae genes